Grandview Municipality is a rural municipality (RM) in the Parkland Region of Manitoba, Canada. It is located in a valley between Duck Mountain Provincial Forest & Park and Riding Mountain National Park, which both lie partially within the RM's territory.

The municipality includes the communities of Grandview (an unincorporated urban community) and Meharry. The Grandview station is located within the RM, through which a Canadian National Railway track serviced by VIA Rail runs through.

History

The RM was incorporated on January 1, 2015, via the amalgamation of the RM of Grandview and the Town of Grandview. It was formed as a requirement of The Municipal Amalgamations Act, which required that municipalities with a population less than 1,000 amalgamate with one or more neighbouring municipalities by 2015. The Government of Manitoba initiated these amalgamations in order for municipalities to meet the 1997 minimum population requirement of 1,000 to incorporate a municipality.

Demographics 

References 

Rural municipalities in Manitoba
2015 establishments in Manitoba
Manitoba municipal amalgamations, 2015
Populated places established in 2015